Jacków  is a village in the administrative district of Gmina Mełgiew, within Świdnik County, Lublin Voivodeship, in eastern Poland.

The village has an approximate population of 1,000.

References

Villages in Świdnik County